The 2009 Three Days of De Panne was the 33rd edition of the Three Days of De Panne cycle race and was held on 31 March to 2 April 2009. The race started in Middelkerke and finished in De Panne. The race was won by Frederik Willems.

General classification

References

Three Days of Bruges–De Panne
2009 in Belgian sport